Giovanni Stefano Menochio,  - , was an Italian Jesuit biblical scholar.

Life 
Menochio was born at Padua, and entered the Society of Jesus on 25 May 1594. After the usual years of training and teaching the classics, he became professor of sacred scripture and then of moral theology at Milan; thereafter began his long life of superiorship. He was successively superior of Cremona, Milan, and Genoa, rector of the Roman College, provincial of the provinces of Milan and Rome, assistant of Italy, and admonitor to the Fathers-General Vincenzo Carafa and Francesco Piccolomini.  He died in Rome.

Works 
His first exegetical essay was a politico-Biblical study: Hieropoliticon, sive Institutiones Politicæ e Sacris Scripturis depromptæ, 956 pages (Lyon, 1625). This book on theocratic politics was dedicated to Cardinal Alessandro Orsini. A second edition (Cologne, 1626) was dedicated to Ferdinand III. The Jesuit poet Sarbewski made this study the subject of an ode (see "Lyrica", II, n. 18). 

The next year there appeared an economic study of the Bible: Institutiones Oeconomicæ ex Sacris Litteris depromptæ, 543 pages (Lyon, 1627). The author translated into Italian these lessons on the care of one's own household; this translation was a posthumous publication: Economia Christiana, 542 pages (Venice, 1656). 

His magnum opus was Brevis Explicatio Sensus Literalis Sacræ Scripturæ optimus quibusque Auctoribus per Epitomen Collecta, 3 vols., 115 pages, 449, 549+29 (Cologne, 1630). Many other editions of this commentary have been published in many lands: Cologne, 1659; Antwerp, 1679; Lyons, 1683, 1697, 1703; the revised edition of René-Joseph Tournemine, S. J., published at Paris, 1719, 1721, 1731; Avignon, 1768; Ghent, 1829; the enlarged and revised edition of Francesco Antonio Zaccaria, S. J., published at Venice, 1743, 1755, 1761. 

The scholia of Menochio are introduced into the Bibla Magna and the Bibla Maxima of Jean de La Haye; the Bibla Sacra of Lucas Brugensis; the Cursus Script. Sacr. of Migne; fourteen editions of the Sainte Bible of Louis de Carrières, S. J.; and La Sainte Bible of Claude-Joseph Drioux (Paris, 1873). 

A later critic, Simon, though not at all in sympathy with Menochio's orthodoxy, says "C'est un des plus judicieux scoliates que nous ayons tant sur le Vieux que sur le Nouveau Testament" (Hist. Crit. du N. T., xliv). Reusch (Kirchenlexikon) prefers the notes of Menochio to those of Manuel de Sá and Mariana. 

This commentator sought to find the literal meaning of the Holy Writ in the Bible and the Fathers. Menochio studied the text in its original, and brought to bear upon that study knowledge of Jewish antiquities.

Main works 
 
 
 
 Le stuore, tessute di varia erudizione sacra, morale e profana (Rome, 1646-54, 6 vols. 4to); the first published under the fictitious name of Giovanni Corona.

See also
 Hebrew republic

References 
 
 
 
 
 

1575 births
1655 deaths
Italian biblical scholars
17th-century Italian Jesuits
Writers from Pavia